Anoda is a genus of flowering plants in the mallow family. There are 23 or 24 species of these herbs, most native to Mexico and South America. They are generally erect plants with a variety of leaf shapes, and many bear colorful flowers. Most bear distinctive disk-shaped segmented fruits.

Selected species:
Anoda abutiloides - Indian anoda
Anoda crenatiflora - thicket anoda
Anoda cristata - crested anoda, spurred anoda, violeta del campo
Anoda lanceolata - lanceleaf anoda
Anoda pentaschista - field anoda
Anoda reticulata - netted anoda
Anoda thurberi - Arizona anoda

External links

USDA Plants Profile for Anoda
USDA Plants Classification: species of Anoda

Malveae
Malvaceae genera
Taxa named by Antonio José Cavanilles